The 1953 Bulgarian Cup Final was the 13th final of the Bulgarian Cup (in this period the tournament was named Cup of the Soviet Army), and was contested between Lokomotiv Sofia and Levski Sofia on 25 November 1953 at Vasil Levski National Stadium in Sofia. Lokomotiv won the final 2–1, claiming their second national cup title.

Match

Details

See also
1953 A Group

References

Bulgarian Cup finals
PFC Levski Sofia matches
Cup Final